The E1 Gavilán ('Sparrowhawk' in English) is an unman electrical-surveillance airplane designed and manufactured by the Mexican firm Hydra Technologies of Mexico. The aircraft is a remotely controlled unmanned aerial vehicle.

The Gavilán was presented on June 10, 2008, in San Diego, California by 'Hydra Technologies of Mexico' in AUVSI (Association for Unmanned Vehicle Systems International) North America 2008. E1 Gavilán was also presented at the Farnborough Airshow on July 14.

Description 
The Gavilán is a multipurpose reusable unmanned aerial system for surveillance. This airplane is faster and takes less space than the S4 Ehécatl.

The plane's main feature is that it does not rely on a runway for takeoff, making it easier to maneuver on uneven terrain by the help of manual control.

The aircraft has a 90-minutes flight autonomy, and controlled by a single user by means of a portable GCS.

The system was developed by the Mexican Federal Government, Nafinsa and academic or scientific institutions such as CONACYT, Instituto Politécnico Nacional, Universidad Autónoma de Guadalajara and ITESO.

Specifications 
Unmanned aerial vehicle (UAV)
Weight:  5 kg
Operation radio: 10 km
Take-off mode: Catapult
Payload: Interchangeable module equipped with mission sensor and flight camera
Extension: 150 cm (1.5 m)
Power source: Electric Battery
Autonomous power: Electric Engine
Flight autonomy: 90 minutes
Operational Height: Around 8000 feet above sea level.

Uses 
  - The Mexican Secretariat of Public Security (Secretaría de Seguridad Pública, SSP).

See also 
The S4 Ehécatl
Hydra Technologies of Mexico

References

External links 
 Official web-page: Hydra Technologies de Mexico.

Gallery 

2000s Mexican military reconnaissance aircraft
Unmanned aerial vehicles of Mexico
Gavilan
Pusher aircraft